Threadsafe may refer to:

 Thread safety, a computer programming concept applicable to multi-threaded programs
 ThreadSafe, a source code analysis tool for detecting Java concurrency defects